Docol is a town in the north-central Mudug region of Somalia. The town is located in the state of Galmudug, in the Galkayo District

References

External links
 Docol

Docol
Populated places in Somalia
Cities in Somalia
Galmudug